Asharq News (Arabic: الشرق للأخبار) is a television channel and a number of technologically sophisticated internet platforms that offer the Arab world round-the-clock news coverage in Arabic, with a focus on regional and global economics.
Asharq News was launched on 11 November 2020, and it is a subsidiary of SRMG, the Saudi Research and Media Group.

Asharq News Headquarters 
Asharq News headquarters is located in Riyadh, and it has central offices in Dubai International Financial Center in the UAE and Washington DC in the US. Also, it has other significant studios in Cairo and Abu Dhabi and offices across key Arab and global cities and capitals. 
Asharq News has other local offices and journalists in capitals and critical cities across the region and globally.  
The CEO of Asharq News is Nabeel Al-Khatib, who is an ex-Al Arabiya executive.

SRMG and Bloomberg 
Through Asharq Business, SRMG and Bloomberg work together to deliver material to SRMG's news service, Asharq News. The latter is made possible via a deal for exclusive content. Through this agreement, the Asharq Business and Bloomberg teams have access to Bloomberg's analysis and market data, which are heavily focused on finance and the economy. Asharq News is powered by Asharq Business and Bloomberg, whose teams have access to more than 2700 journalists and financial and economic analysts around the world.

In addition, Asharq News includes an Arabic edition of Bloomberg Businessweek magazine.

Asharq News Programs 
Asharq News airs the following daily programs: 

As for Asharq News weekly programs, they are as follows:

Asharq News also airs monthly programs, which are:

References

Arab mass media
Television networks